Vice Admiral Rajesh Pendharkar, AVSM, VSM is a serving Flag officer in the Indian Navy. He currently serves as the Director General Naval Operations (DGNO). He earlier served as the Flag Officer Sea Training (FOST) and as the Flag Officer Commanding Maharashtra Naval Area (FOMA).

Education 
Pendharkar is a graduate of the National Defence Academy, Khadakvasla. He was commissioned into the Indian Navy in January 1987. He attended the  graduate course of the Defence Services Staff College, Wellington, as well as the Naval War College. Pendharkar also attended the Naval Command College, Rhode Island, USA. He holds a Master’s Degree in Defence and Strategic Studies.

Navy career 
Pendharkar was commissioned into the Indian Navy in January 1987. He is an Anti-Submarine Warfare (ASW) specialist. His operational assignments include commissioning crew of the Sukanya-class patrol vessel , ASW Officer of the Nilgiri-class frigate  and the Godavari-class guided-missile frigate .

Pendharkar served as the Executive Officer of the Khukri-class corvette  and the Delhi-class guided-missile destroyer . He has commanded the lead ship of her class of corvettes  and the lead ship of her class of stealth missile frigate . He also commanded the aircraft carrier  and was her penultimate commanding officer.

His staff assignments include Flag Lieutenant to the Flag Officer Commanding Maharashtra Naval Area, and instructor at the National Defence Academy. He has also served Joint Director in the Directorate of Staff Requirements and Joint Director in the Directorate of Personnel. As a Commodore, he served as the Principal Director, Net-Centric Operations and as the Principal Director in the Directorate of Personnel.

Flag rank
Pendharkar was promoted to the rank of Rear Admiral in February 2016 and was appointed Assistant Chief of Integrated Defence Staff (ACIDS) at Defence Intelligence Agency.He then moved to HQ Western Naval Command as the Chief Staff Officer (Operations). On 25 March 2019, he was appointed Flag Officer Commanding Maharashtra Naval Area. In February 2020, he took over as the Flag Officer Sea Training (FOST) in Kochi. As FOST, his charter included the conduct of the operational sea training of all ships of the Indian Navy and the Indian Coast Guard.

On 7 June 2021, he was promoted to the rank of Vice Admiral and appointed Director General Naval Operations at Naval HQ.

Awards and decorations
Pendharkar is a recipient of the Ati Vishisht Seva Medal (AVSM) and Vishisht Seva Medal (VSM) for distinguished service.

References 

Living people
Indian Navy admirals
Flag Officers Sea Training
Year of birth missing (living people)
Naval War College alumni
Recipients of the Ati Vishisht Seva Medal
Recipients of the Vishisht Seva Medal
Defence Services Staff College alumni